Scoliopteryx is a genus of moths in the family Erebidae. The genus was erected by Ernst Friedrich Germar in 1810.

Species
 Scoliopteryx libatrix Linnaeus, 1758 – the herald
 Scoliopteryx aksuana Sheljuzhko, 1955

References

Scoliopteryginae
Noctuoidea genera